The equestrian events at the 1988 Seoul Olympics included dressage, eventing, and show jumping. All three disciplines had both individual and team competitions.

Medal summary

Medals

Officials
Appointment of officials was as follows:

Dressage
  Wolfgang Niggli (Ground Jury President)
  Nicholas Williams (Ground Jury Member)
  Heinz Schütte (Ground Jury Member)
  Elena Kondratieva (Ground Jury Member)
  Donald Thackeray (Ground Jury Member)

Jumping
  Knud Larsen (Ground Jury President)
  Hans Britschgi (Ground Jury Member)
  Jaap Rijks (Ground Jury Member)
  Johnson Kim (Ground Jury Member)
  Olaf Petersen (Course Designer)
  Pamela Carruthers (Technical Delegate)

Eventing
  Bernd Springorum (Ground Jury President)
  Anton Bühler (Ground Jury Member)
  François Lucas (Ground Jury Member)
  Hugh Thomas (Course Designer)
  Ewen B. Graham (Technical Delegate)

References

 
1988 Summer Olympics events
1988
1988 in equestrian